The Renault GBC 180 is an all-terrain truck used by the French armed forces since the late 1990s.

History 
The GBC 180 is an advanced upgrade and refurbished version of the Berliet GBC 8 KT, with a new engine and transmission, and an increased payload of 5,000 kg.

The GBC 180 conversion was announced in 1997, when a first batch of 2,800 trucks were ordered. By 2009, over 5,500 trucks were upgraded to the GBC 180 variant.

Characteristics 
The GBC 180 has a six-cylinder diesel engine, the MIDR 06.02.26. The engine can run on diesel or kerosene.

References 

Military vehicles introduced in the 1990s
GBC 180
Military trucks of France
Off-road vehicles